Acacia dermatophylla is a shrub belonging to the genus Acacia and the subgenus Phyllodineae that is endemic to southern parts of Western Australia.

Description
It blooms from July to October and produces yellow flowers.

Taxonomy
The species was first formally described by the botanist George Bentham in 1864 as part of the work Flora Australiensis. It was reclassified as Racosperma dermatophyllum by Leslie Pedley in 2003 then transferred back to the genus Acacia'''' in 2006.

Distribution
It is native to an area in the Wheatbelt, Goldfields-Esperance and Great Southern regions of Western Australia. The range of A dermatophylla'' extends from Lake Grace in the west to past Esperance in the east where it is found on undulating plains and low-lying areas including around salt flats growing in sandy, loamy or clay soils as a part of in tall heath or mallee communities.

See also
List of Acacia species

References

dermatophylla
Acacias of Western Australia
Plants described in 1864
Taxa named by George Bentham